Aung Thu (born 8 July 1955) is a Burmese politician who was Minister for Agriculture, Livestock and Irrigation of Myanmar (Burma) from 2018 to 2021.

Early life and education
Aung Thu was born on 8 July 1955 to Ba Thaung, a goldsmith, and Khin Lay, in Yesagyo, Burma (now Myanmar). He holds a doctorate degree in mathematics. Aung Thu is married to Khin Thida, and has one daughter, Thiri Thinza Aung.

Career 
On 22 March 2016, Aung Thu was nominated as Minister for Agriculture, Livestock and Irrigation in President Htin Kyaw's Cabinet. On 24 March, the Assembly of the Union confirmed his nomination. On 1 February, during the 2021 Myanmar coup d'état, Aung Thu was placed under house arrest by the Myanmar Armed Forces.

He previously served as Amyotha Hluttaw MP for Yangon Region № 6 constituency.

References

1955 births
Living people
Members of the House of Nationalities
National League for Democracy politicians
University of Yangon alumni
Government ministers of Myanmar
People from Magway Division
Agriculture ministers of Myanmar